John Knightley may refer to:

 John Knightley (Emma)
John Knightley (MP) for Warwickshire
Sir John Knightley, 1st Baronet (c. 1611–c. 1670) of the Knightley baronets
Sir John Knightley, 2nd Baronet (died 1689) of the Knightley baronets
Sir John Knightley, 1st Baronet (1747–1812) of the Knightley baronets